The Ottawa Race Weekend (also known as Tamarack Ottawa Race Weekend for sponsorship reasons) is an annual weekend of road running events held the last weekend of May in the city of Ottawa, Ontario, Canada.  The two-day running event includes seven races, including the Ottawa Marathon, all of which start and end at Ottawa City Hall.  The marathon was first held in 1975, and is categorized as a Gold Label Road Race by World Athletics.  Over 40,000 participants take part in the races each year.

The Ottawa Race Weekend also includes Canada's largest health and fitness expo, which opens on the Thursday before the weekend.  In addition, each year, participants in the Ottawa Race Weekend raise close to $1 million for approximately 25 local and national charities affiliated with the event.

The 2020 and 2021 editions of the race were cancelled due to the COVID-19 coronavirus pandemic.

Races 

The race weekend includes seven races: a 1.2 km kids marathon, 2K, 5K, 10K, half marathon, wheelchair marathon, and marathon.  All of the races start and finish at Ottawa City Hall.

The signature event of the weekend is the Ottawa Marathon, which was first held in 1975. Today it is the largest marathon event in Canada and is a qualifier for the Boston Marathon. The event is also home to the Canadian Marathon Championships and the Canadian Forces Marathon Championships.

The Ottawa Race Weekend was at one point the only road racing event in the world to host two IAAF Silver Label events: the 10K and the Ottawa Marathon. In 2014 the 10k became the first IAAF Gold Label road race in Canada. On October 22, 2015, the Marathon also became an IAAF Gold Label road race.

History

Management 
The event is organized by Run Ottawa, a not-for-profit organization. More than 2,000 volunteers, including a volunteer race committee, support a team of five full-time staff in organizing the event.

Winners 
Key:
  Course record (in bold)
  Canadian championship race

Marathon

 † Bouramdane was declared the official winner. A number of faster runners, led by Amos Tirop Matui, were disqualified after a route error caused them to cut 400 m off the true marathon distance.

10K race

See also
 List of marathon races in North America

Notes

References

 Winners lists
 Ottawa 10 km. Association of Road Racing Statisticians (2012-05-30). Retrieved on 2012-06-03.
 Ottawa Marathon. Association of Road Racing Statisticians (2012-05-30). Retrieved on 2012-06-03.

External links 

 Race Weekend Homepage

10K runs
1975 establishments in Ontario
Annual sporting events in Canada
Marathons in Canada
Recurring sporting events established in 1975
Sport in Ottawa
Spring (season) events in Canada